Level-5 Comcept, formerly known as Comcept Inc., is a Japanese video game developer based in Osaka, founded on December 1, 2010 by Keiji Inafune, formerly of Capcom.

Their projects include Soul Sacrifice, Mighty No. 9, ReCore and Red Ash: The Indelible Legend. In addition to games on handheld and home consoles, the studio has developed multiple mobile games. In 2017, the company was acquired by Level-5, adopting its current name in the process.

History

Founding 
Keiji Inafune founded Comcept after his departure from Capcom in December 2010. After the cancellation of Mega Man Legends 3, which he mentioned as a "long-time held dream", he thought that "not only had he abandoned himself, but the fans too".

The name "Comcept" is a combination of the words Computer and Concept. The studio is largely composed of veteran staff who worked on Mega Man, as well as young staff who grew up with the franchise. Comcept is a design and production studio which pairs up with other studios to develop games. This often includes working on multiple games at once, and doing a variety of genres instead of being narrowly focused.

Comcept's first game was the free to play smartphone title, The Island of Dr. Momo. The game had micro-transactions, and was released through the GREE platform. They also developed another mobile game, J.J. Rockets.

Yaiba: Ninja Gaiden Z 

In September 2012, the team's next project was revealed as a new Ninja Gaiden title, named Yaiba: Ninja Gaiden Z. The game is a collaboration between Comcept, Team Ninja, and American developer Spark Unlimited. When announcing the game, Inafune said: "“I’m very happy to stand here next to Mr. Hayashi today, and we’ll prove to you that we are going to survive and make good games that will lead the Japanese game industry."

The game was released in March 2014 to a largely negative reception, with Metacritic giving it a score of 43. GamesRadar included it in their list of "the 50 worst games of all time".

Kaio: King of Pirates 
It was set for release on the Nintendo 3DS. Using a pirate setting, the plot was a retelling of the Chinese story Romance of the Three Kingdoms. Marvelous cancelled the game in 2015, and reported a loss of ¥461 million (roughly $3.8 million USD) on the project.

Soul Sacrifice 
In 2013, Comcept assisted Sony Computer Entertainment and its Japan Studio in designing the PlayStation Vita game Soul Sacrifice and the expansion, Soul Sacrifice Delta.

Mighty No. 9 

At PAX Prime 2013, Inafune held a special panel in order to reveal a brand new project called Mighty No. 9, a spiritual successor to the Mega Man series. At the end of the panel, Inafune officially launched the game's Kickstarter campaign. He thought that Kickstarter would be "a great way to make dreams a reality". The game was developed jointly with Inti Creates (another studio founded by Capcom staff). After several delays, the game was released in 2016. It was met with a mixed critical reception for its level of quality and gameplay.

Following the release of the game, Inafune stated: "You know, I want to word this in a way to explain some of the issues that come with trying to make a game of this size on multiple platforms." adding "I'm kind of loath to say this because it's going to sound like an excuse and I don't want to make any excuses. I own all the problems that came with this game and if you want to hurl insults at me, it's totally my fault. I'm the key creator. I will own that responsibility." His translator, Ben Judd, followed up these remarks by giving his assessment of the project: "In this case, it was do the base game and do all the ports all at the same time. And it ended up being a huge amount of work, more than they actually estimated. Definitely, when they looked at the project, they were wrong about a lot of things. They underestimated how much work, time and money was going to be necessary. All of those things create a huge amount of pressure." Later Judd added “But, again, we can hope that if things go well, there'll be sequels. Because I'll tell you what, I'm not getting my 2D side-scrolling fill. And at the end of the day, even if it's not perfect, it's better than nothing. At least, that's my opinion.”

In 2017, Comcept licensed the Mighty No. 9 characters to Inti Creates, allowing them to feature the characters however they wished, free of charge, in their Nintendo Switch game Mighty Gunvolt Burst.

Red Ash 

Red Ash: The Indelible Legend was announced as a spiritual successor to the Mega Man Legends series. The game was to be funded via Kickstarter, a campaign that ended with $519,999, well short of its $800,000 goal. It was later announced on July 30, 2015, that Chinese game company Fuze would finance the game.

The campaign for Red Ash was heavily criticized by game journalists and fans alike, describing it as rushed and poorly planned.

A CGI short titled Red Ash: -Gearworld-, originally known as Red Ash: -Magicicada-, was funded by a separate Kickstarter campaign handled by Studio 4°C, that was released to coincide with the game. The short was released in March 2017 as part of the Young Animator Training Project's Anime Mirai 2017 project.

Level-5 
In 2017, Comcept was acquired by Level-5 and became Level-5 Comcept. The Tokyo location was closed, leaving the Osaka location as the sole base of operations. Their first game under Level-5 was the mobile game Dragon & Colonies, launched in June 2019. The game was shut down on February 17, 2020. 
Additionally, they have provided development assistance for various of Level-5's latest games such as Yo-kai Watch Jam: Yo-kai Academy Y – Waiwai Gakuen Seikatsu and Megaton Musashi. In February 8, 2023 it was revealed Level-5 Comcept would handle the development of Fantasy Life i: The Girl Who Steals Time, slated to come out later that same year.

Games developed

Notes

References

External links
 Official website (Japanese)
 Comcept blog (Japanese)
 Original Comcept site

Video game companies of Japan
Video game development companies
Mass media in Osaka
Japanese companies established in 2010
Video game companies established in 2010
2017 mergers and acquisitions
Level-5 (company)